Thomas Chippenham may refer to:
Thomas Chippenham (archdeacon), archdeacon of York and of Totnes
Thomas Chippenham (fl. 1388–1402), MP for Hereford
Thomas Chippenham (fl. 1420–1431), MP for Hereford